(born June 16, 1961) is a Japanese musician and video game designer based in Tokyo, Japan. He was born in Osaka on June 16, 1961, and majored in Industrial Society at Ritsumeikan University. He has worked extensively with music and images, and has been active with the J-Pop band Psy-S. Matsuura has been credited with popularizing the modern rhythm-based music video game at his studio NanaOn-Sha.

Career
In April 1983, shortly after his graduation from Ritsumeikan University, Matsuura met singer Chaka (Mami Yasunori) and founded Psy-S. The band's first album, Different View, was released in 1985. The group's musical style is a mixture of experimental synthesizer, electric guitar, and vocals. Matsuura is the band's composer and arranger, and he performs using a Fairlight CMI synthesizer. He has also mastered the keyboard, guitar, and bass and he occasionally performs these instruments in stage as well.

In the late 80s, Psy-S enjoyed fair degree of popularity in Japan thanks to a number of hits. Certain of their songs have been used in such anime shows as City Hunter, and in films. In 1987, Masaya Matsuura oversaw musical composition for the anime adaptation of To-Y,  Atsushi Kamijo's manga.

Technological development occurring during the 1990s generated increased interest in Matsuura in creating computer-based music and from this field Matsuura soon transitioned into interactive music and music video games. In 1993 Matsuura became the first Japanese musician to release a CD-ROM, The Seven Colors, for which he was awarded the "Multimedia Grand Prix". In June 1996, after having produced 10 albums with Psy-S (and four "best of" albums), Matsura quit the band, and focused his attention on his multimedia projects.

Matsuura founded the Tokyo-based production company, NanaOn-Sha, and began development of video games. The first major project would be a unique game fusing hip-hop rhythms the visual talents of American illustrator Rodney Greenblat from California. Released in December 1996 in Japan, PaRappa the Rapper is regarded as one of the first modern rhythm games. Matsuura's talent for combining music and video game play would again be demonstrated with his 1999 release of the generative music game Vib-Ribbon, and would cement his position as one of the founders of the music game genre.

In 2003, Matsuura together with NanaOn-Sha was responsible for the production of the audio portion of Sony's third generation robotic dog toy, AIBO (model ERS-7).  This included both music and sound effects.

In 2004, he was awarded the "First Penguin" award by the International Game Developers Association (IGDA) for his innovative contributions to the video game industry.

Music albums 
Masaya Matsuura has released 10 music albums with Psy-S, 4 "best of" albums with Psy-S, and 2 solo albums. All albums were released under the Sony Music label.

With Psy-S 
 1985 – Different View
 1986 – PIC-NIC
 1987 – Collection (Compilation)
 1988 – Mint-Electric
 1989 – Atlas
 1990 – Signal
 1991 – Two Hearts
 1991 – Holiday
 1992 – Two Sprits Live PSY'S Best Selection (Live)
 1993 – Window
 1994 – Home Made
 1994 – Emotional Engine
 1996 – Two Bridge (Compilation)
 1998 – Brand New Diary + Another Diary (Compilation)
 2012 – Psyclopedia (CD Box Set)

Solo 
 1989 – Sweet Home
 2013 – Beyooond!!!

Games 
 Metamor Jupiter (1993, PC Engine CD) as music composer
 The Seven Colors: Legend of PSY・S City (1993, Apple Macintosh)
 Tunin'Glue (1996, Apple Bandai Pippin)
 PaRappa the Rapper (1996, PS1),(2007, PSP),(2017, PS4)
 UmJammer Lammy (1999, PS1)
 Vib-Ribbon (1999, PS1)
 Rhyme Rider Kerorican (2000, Bandai WonderSwan)
 PaRappa the Rapper 2 (2002, PS2),(2015, PS4)
 Mojib-Ribbon (2003, PS2)
 Vib-Ripple (2004, PS2)
 Tamagotchi Connection: Corner Shop (2005, Nintendo DS)
 Musika (2007, iPod)
 Tamagotchi Connection: Corner Shop 2 (2007, Nintendo DS)
 Tamagotchi Connection: Corner Shop 3 (2007, Nintendo DS)
 Major Minor's Majestic March (2009, Wii)
 WINtA (2010, iPhone/iPod Touch)
 Haunt (2012, Xbox 360)
 Beat Sports (2015, Apple TV)
 Furusoma (2016, iOS)
 Project Rap Rabbit (Cancelled)

Prizes and awards
 1997 – Multimedia Grand Prix (Creator Awards) • MMCA Artist Award
 1998 – Interactive Achievement Awards • Game Design and Sound Design (for PaRappa The Rapper)
 1998 – IGDA Spotlight Awards • Innovative Game Design, Use of Audio and Game Soundtrack (for PaRappa The Rapper)
 2000 – Interactive Achievement Awards • original music composition (for UmJammer Lammy)
 2004 – Game Developers Choice Awards • First Penguin Award 2004

References

External links
NanaOn-Sha.com

1961 births
Japanese composers
Japanese male composers
Japanese video game designers
Living people
Musicians from Osaka
Video game composers
Game Developers Conference Pioneer Award recipients